The oldest commercial centers in present day Denmark was annual gatherings that eventually grew to form cities. With the establishment of a civic administration these cities received charters (typically from the king) but many of these were lost in time, so that the oldest known privileges tend to be younger than the actual date of the chartered borough.

Boroughs known to have had a charter before the introduction of the first urban law of 1422:
 Bogense (1288)
 Ebeltoft (1301)
 Fåborg (1251)
 Haderslev (1292)
 Herrested (1258 - later recalled)
 Hjørring (1243)
 Horsens (1317)
 Kerteminde (1413)
 Kolding (1321)
 København (1254)
 Køge (1288)
 Nakskov (1266)
 Nyborg (1292)
 Nysted (1409)
 Odense (1335)
 Præstø (1403)
 Randers (1302)
 Ribe (1214)
 Roskilde (1268)
 Rudkøbing (1287)
 Sakskøbing (1306)
 Skagen (1413)
 Skive, Denmark (1326)
 Skælskør (1414)
 Slagelse (1288)
 Slangerup (1301 - later recalled)
 Stubbekøbing (1354)
 Svendborg (1253)
 Tønder (1243)
 Vejle (1326)
 Vordingborg (1415)
 Åbenrå (1335)
 Åkirkeby (1346)
 Ålborg (1342)

All of these dates are the latest possible for the charter and many of them are known to be renewals. Furthermore, the following boroughs are of Medieval origin but there exists no charter handed down from before 1422:
 Allinge-Sandvig
 Assens (1510)
 Borre (1460)
 Grenå (1440)
 Hasle
 Helsingør (1426)
 Hillerød
 Hobro
 Holbæk
 Holstebro
 Kalundborg (1443)
 Korsør (1425)
 Lemvig
 Maribo (1488)
 Middelfart (1496)
 Nexø
 Nibe (1518)
 Nykøbing Falster (1451)
 Nykøbing Mors
 Nykøbing Sjælland (1443)
 Næstved
 Ringkøbing (1443)
 Ringsted
 Rødby (1454)
 Rønne (1490)
 Skibby (later recalled)
 Stege
 Stigs Bjergby
 Store Heddinge (1441)
 Svaneke
 Sæby
 Søborg (later recalled)
 Varde (1442)
 Viborg
 Sønderborg (1461)
 Ærøskøbing
 Århus (1441]

Later additions until the introduction of constitutional Monarchy in 1849:
 Christianshavn (later recalled)
 Fredericia
 Frederikshavn
 Frederikssund
 Hørsholm (later recalled)
 Mariager
 Gammel Ry (later recalled)
 Thisted

Modern additions until the abolishment of chartered boroughs in 1970:
 Brønderslev
 Esbjerg
 Frederiksværk
 Herning
 Nørresundby
 Silkeborg
 Skjern
 Struer

References

Lists of populated places in Denmark
Denmark